The Worrell 1000 Race is an offshore long distance beach catamaran sailboat race that was held May 6–18, 2019 and that will be held again May 9–21, 2022. The race runs in the waters between Florida and Virginia Beach, United States. The race will cover approximately 1000 miles with overnight stops at multiple locations along the East Coast of the United States.  The organizing authority for the 2022 Worrell 1000 Race  will be Worrell 1000 Race Reunion Race, Inc., a 501(c)(3) nonprofit organization, (dba Worrell 1000 Race).

History

The origins of Worrell 1000 can be traced to a bet in a bar at the Worrell Bros., a Virginia Beach resort restaurant between the owners of the bar, brothers Michael and Chris Worrell. The bet was that it was impossible to sail a sixteen-foot catamaran from Virginia Beach to Florida. On October 1, 1974, Michael Worrell and his crew Steve McGarrett left the Virginia Beach oceanfront with hopes of reaching Florida in one piece. Although they did not win the bet they still sailed through two hurricanes and had to make multiple boat repairs. After twenty days, they had to stop in Fort Lauderdale due to their catamaran being in poor condition.

Later, Worrell thought of turning the 954-mile journey into a regular regatta. The inaugural race, called Worrell Bros. Coastwise Race, took place in May 1976. Four teams participated in the race. For that first race, limited to 16-foot Hobie Cats, there were very few rules. The participants could sail day and night, but they were supposed to come ashore and phone the restaurant once every 24 hours. The course was flipped with the start in Fort Lauderdale and the finish in Virginia Beach, to take advantage of the prevailing winds. The only team to finish the first race was that of Worrell and crew Guerry Beatson. Two racers didn't make it past Georgia, however the boat crewed by Peter Guthrie and Alan Kramer maintained the lead through Nags Head, North Carolina. Knowing they were well ahead they pulled ashore at the Nags Head pier to take a break.  In the distance they saw a sail far to the south and ran to the beach to launch their boat for the final run to Virginia Beach.  However, they did not realize how steep the surf was and when they attempted to launch in the high surf it overturned the boat and it broke apart allowing Worrell and Benson to win. The inaugural race took 13 days to complete.

In 1985, the rules were changed to allow any catamaran within a 20-foot length, 8-foot beam, instead of just Hobie Cats. In 1988, the rules were changed to allow only 20-foot catamarans. 

In 1988 new owners World 1000. INC., George Hazzis and V. Alfred Etheridge Jr. took over. In 1988 the name was changed to World 1000, to reflect its development into an international event drawing champion sailors from across the United States and around the World, the race is more daring than ever, holding fast to its basis premises, make the rules simple, take the best of both sailor and the equipment, and ingenuity, courage, and determination, keep the United states on the left, and go as fast as you can. Each boat in the World 1000 must be no longer than 21 1/4 feet. Must float if capsized, must solely be powered by wind and currents of the water, must be capable of safely launching from and landing the beach, must weigh more than 400 pounds.   

For 2019, eligible classes were the Nacra F20 Carbon (in compliance with international Nacra F20 Carbon Class Rules dated 2011 (Revision 2018) and the Formula 18. For the 2022 event, scheduled to take place May 9 to May 21, 2022, only F18s will be allowed to compete.

Michael Worrell died on June 5, 2010.

Race strategy 

There have been many teams who have discussed their individual strategies over the years, and for the most part - the single, best one is to "Keep the continent to your left and sail as fast as you can." The second - don't go too far offshore, even if you think the wind looks better. Many a skipper has ventured out only to find they gave up a lot of distance and fell back in the standings. Cape Hatteras can be very tricky and the famed "Atlantic Graveyard" has competitors sailing over many a lost ship on the ocean floor. Be mindful of advice from past competitors and heed all warnings given by the race committee and PRO - all of which are seasoned Worrell veterans and do their best to steer the competitors right. Don't confuse shoals with sea turtles.

See also
 Hobie Hotline article 1979 Race pages 24-29
 Yachting magazine August 1980 announcing the winners for that year page 116
 Sports Illustrated article about the 1981 race
 Hobie Hotline article 1982 race pages 40-43, 47
 pdf Hobie Hotline article 1984 race pages 30-43
 Small article about the 1985 race, Yachting magazine September 1985, page 58
 MotorBoating & Sailing book August 1987 detailed article about that year's race and historical info
 Outside magazine September article about the 1998 race

References

External links
 

Annual sporting events in the United States
Recurring sporting events established in 1974
Sailing competitions in the United States